This article documents the status of motorsports in the 1940s.

North America

Due to the popularity of sedan racing, a professional racing series known as the Strictly Stock Series is established. In contrast to the hot rod racing popular in the US, this new series uses unmodified "stock cars". The series quickly becomes popular throughout the country.
The Sports Car Club of America is founded
Oldsmobile introduces the 88, later to become competitive in racing and the subject of the famous rock and roll song Rocket 88
Racing legend Sam Posey is born
Racing legend Mario Andretti is born
The original Daytona Beach Road Course is established out of the new Strictly Stock Series. It quickly becomes one of the staples of the series until it closes about a decade later.

Europe
Racing legend Jacky Ickx is born.

References

See also
1930s in motorsport
1950s in motorsport

1940s in motorsport